Gholam Hussain Nourian (born 16 March 1935) is an Iranian footballer. He competed in the men's tournament at the 1964 Summer Olympics.

References

External links
 

1935 births
Living people
Iranian footballers
Iran international footballers
Olympic footballers of Iran
Footballers at the 1964 Summer Olympics
Place of birth missing (living people)
Association football midfielders